The following is a list of the municipalities (comuni) of Trentino-Alto Adige/Südtirol, Italy.

There are 291 municipalities in Trentino-Alto Adige/Südtirol (as of January 2019):

116 in the Province of South Tyrol
175 in the Province of Trentino

List

See also
List of municipalities of Italy

References

 
Geography of Trentino-Alto Adige/Südtirol
Trentino-Alto Adige Sudtirol